Erik Gustaf Bergvall (7 April 1880 – 4 February 1950) was a Swedish water polo player, journalist and sports official. He also promoted the Bergvall system, a variation of the traditional knockout  tournament system which was used at the 1912, 1920 and 1924 Summer Olympics.

Water polo player
As a water polo player, Bergvall represented Sweden at the 1908 Summer Olympics and helped the national water polo team gain the bronze medal in the water polo.

Sports official
In 1904 Bergvall was among the founding member of the Swedish Swimming Federation and served as its secretary between 1904 and 1908 and as chairman between 1909 and 1932. He was also a member of the board of the Swedish Sports Confederation from its foundation in 1903 until 1945. He also served as assistant secretary of the Swedish Olympic Committee in 1906 and again between 1913 and 1924. In addition he was among the founders of the Fédération Internationale de Natation in 1908 and was a member of its board until 1928. Between 1924 and 1928 he also served as FINA president. From 1916 to 1946, Bergvall also served as Director for the Stockholm Olympic Stadium.

Journalist
As a journalist Bergvall worked mainly at the sportspaper Nordiskt Idrottslif, published between 1900 and 1920. He had two spells working for this newspaper, firstly between 1900 and 1903 and then again between 1905 and 1920. He was also the chief editor and compiler of the official report of the 1912 Summer Olympics and wrote and/or edited or was a main contributor to some 30 books, including reports on the Olympic Games between 1920 and 1948 for the Swedish Olympic Committee.

See also
 List of Olympic medalists in water polo (men)

References

External links
 

1880 births
1950 deaths
Swedish male water polo players
Water polo players at the 1908 Summer Olympics
Olympic water polo players of Sweden
Olympic bronze medalists for Sweden
Presidents of FINA
Olympic medalists in water polo
Medalists at the 1908 Summer Olympics
20th-century Swedish journalists